"Rompe" is a song recorded by Puerto Rican rapper Daddy Yankee. The song held the number one spot of Billboards Hot Latin Tracks chart for over three months and reached a peak position of number 24 on the Billboard Hot 100 chart of the same publication, showcasing an evident trend among Latin songs having great cross-over appeal among the mainstream American market (since Shakira's "La Tortura" entered the top 20 on the same chart). The music video was in heavy rotation on MTV becoming one of the few reggaeton videos to do so reaching the position number 10 of Billboard MTV Video Monitor in 2006.

Remix
A remix has been released that features G-Unit members Lloyd Banks and Young Buck and the Canadian singer Nelly Furtado. It was nominated for "Best Latin/Reggaeton Track" at the 22nd Annual International Dance Music Awards in 2007, which was ultimately won by Shakira and Wyclef Jean with their number one single "Hips Don't Lie".

Chart performance

Weekly charts

Year-end charts

All-time charts

Certifications and sales

References

External links

2005 singles
Daddy Yankee songs
Reggaeton songs
Spanish-language songs
2005 songs